is a Japanese former tennis player.

On 4 May 2009, she achieved her career-high singles ranking of world No. 148. On 11 April 2005, she peaked at No. 144 in the doubles rankings.

Tomoko, the sister of Akiko Yonemura, won seven singles and eleven doubles titles on the ITF Women's Circuit.

Last match played in 2011, Yonemura retired from professional tennis 2015.

ITF Circuit finals

Singles: 10 (7 titles, 3 runner-ups)

Doubles: 21 (11 titles, 10 runner-ups)

External links
 
 

1982 births
Living people
Japanese female tennis players
Tennis players at the 2006 Asian Games
Asian Games medalists in tennis
Medalists at the 2006 Asian Games
Asian Games bronze medalists for Japan